Megalopus elongatus is a beetle of the Megalopodidae family. It is found in Brazil and Colombia.

References

Megalopodidae
Taxa named by Joseph Sugar Baly
Beetles of South America